Ski Ward Ski Area is a small ski area located in Shrewsbury, Massachusetts.

Ski Ward has nine trails covering a vertical drop of approximately 220 feet. The summit is served by a triple chairlift and t-bar, while the beginner area has a handle tow and carpet lift. There is a lodge with a bar and grill, restrooms, guest services, rental shop and ski patrol first aid room.

Ski Ward also has a tubing facility with 8 lanes serviced by 2 lifts.

Boston area schools including Wellesley High School and Westwood High School hold their Ski Team practices at Ward and the hill hosts both practices and races on White Out almost every day of the week. Ski Ward has is also host to USASA Boardercross events, rail jams and terrain park competitions and a variety of other special events.

History
The facility began operation in 1939, known as Ward Hill Ski Area (operated by the Ward family). It has been in continuous operation since that time. In 1990 John and Effy LaCroix purchased the area and began an extensive upgrade, including a snow-tubing slope, a triple chairlift, and improvements to the lighting, snowmaking and snow grooming equipment. A non detachable chairlift brings up skiers to the summit, it is very high.
The truck which originally provided power for the rope tow is still visible, off to the right of the Triple.

Trails
Beginner: 5
Intermediate: 2
Expert: 12

Snowmaking
Ski Ward has 100% snowmaking coverage.

External links
 Ski Ward Official Website

Buildings and structures in Shrewsbury, Massachusetts
Ski areas and resorts in Massachusetts
Sports venues in Worcester County, Massachusetts